Denis Hamlett (born January 9, 1969) is a Costa Rican-American former professional soccer player and coach currently serving as sporting director for the New York Red Bulls in Major League Soccer.

Hamlett spent his entire professional career in the US, playing with the Fort Lauderdale Strikers and the Colorado Rapids, as well as indoor soccer with the Harrisburg Heat and Anaheim Splash. He has been a member of coaching staffs with Chicago Fire, Vancouver Whitecaps, Montreal Impact and New York Red Bulls, including a two-season stint as head coach in Chicago.

Playing career

College
After his parents separated, Hamlett moved to the United States to live with his mother in Silver Spring, Maryland when he was ten years old, where he attended Albert Einstein High School.  In 1987 Hamlett began playing college soccer for UNC Wilmington, before transferring to George Mason University in Fairfax, Virginia after his freshman season. He earned All-Colonial Athletic Association and All-Region accolades during his three seasons of play at George Mason. He graduated in 1992 with a bachelor's degree in public administration and was inducted into the school's Hall of Fame in 2006.

Professional
Hamlett began his professional career on June 10, 1992 when he signed with the Fort Lauderdale Strikers of American Professional Soccer League. He spent the 1992 and 1993 summers playing outdoor soccer with the Strikers. In the fall of 1992, he joined the Harrisburg Heat of the National Professional Soccer League. He spent two seasons with the Heat.  Then from 1994–95, he played summer indoor soccer for the Anaheim Splash of the CISL.

In 1996, Hamlett was drafted by the Colorado Rapids in the second round, 12th overall in Major League Soccer's inaugural draft. His stellar play continued with Colorado, where he won the BIC Tough Defender of the Year award. His playing career ended in 1997 when he suffered a stroke caused by a blood protein deficiency.

Coaching career
Following his retirement from professional play in 1997, Hamlett attained his coaching license from U.S. Soccer. In 1998, Hamlett joined the coaching staff of the Chicago Fire.

He served as an assistant coach during the U.S. Project-40 squad's visit to Portugal, and continued his coaching duties with the Fire, becoming the senior assistant coach in 2001. Upon dismissal of former head coach Dave Sarachan, Hamlett received interim head coaching duties on June 20, 2007, but resumed assistant coaching duties following the arrival of Juan Carlos Osorio. When Osorio resigned take on the head coach job at the New York Red Bulls, Hamlett was hired as the head coach. Following Fire's failure to qualify for the 2009 MLS Cup, Hamlett was fired as head coach on 24 November 2009. Over his two-plus year tenure with the Fire, Hamlett helped the team to back-to-back Eastern Conference Finals, as well as the 2009 SuperLiga Final, going 24-18-21 in league play and 31-23-24 across all competitions.

Denis took up the post of interim coach of the men's soccer team at the Illinois Institute of Technology for the 2010 season, leading them to a conference title and playoff final appearance.

On January 8, 2011, it was announced that Hamlett had joined Vancouver Whitecaps FC in an assistant coaching role. On October 26, 2011, Vancouver announced that it had released Hamlett from his contract.

On January 7, 2012, the Montreal Impact announced that Hamlett was hired as an assistant to manager Jesse Marsch.

Hamlett again joined Marsch's staff with the New York Red Bulls beginning the 2015 season. Prior to the 2017 season, Hamlett moved to New York's front office to assume the role of sporting director.

References

External links
 

1969 births
Living people
People from Limón Province
Association football defenders
Costa Rican footballers
American Professional Soccer League players
American soccer players
Anaheim Splash players
Chicago Fire FC coaches
Colorado Rapids players
Continental Indoor Soccer League players
Fort Lauderdale Strikers (1988–1994) players
George Mason Patriots men's soccer players
Harrisburg Heat players
National Professional Soccer League (1984–2001) players
Major League Soccer players
UNC Wilmington Seahawks men's soccer players
Major League Soccer coaches
Vancouver Whitecaps FC non-playing staff
Chicago Fire FC non-playing staff
Costa Rican football managers
Expatriate soccer managers in the United States
CF Montréal non-playing staff
New York Red Bulls non-playing staff